The following is a list of events affecting Philippine television in 1995. Events listed include television show debuts, finales, cancellations, and channel launches, closures and rebrandings, as well as information about controversies and carriage disputes.

Events 
 January 28: The noontime variety show Eat Bulaga! moved to GMA Network Live at the Araneta Coliseum
 June: GMA Network celebrates its 45th anniversary of broadcasts.
 August 27: The country's second UHF terrestrial TV station, GMA's Citynet Channel 27, is launched.

Premieres

Unknown
 Star Music Video on ABS-CBN 2
 Mighty Morphin Power Rangers on ABS-CBN 2
 Gameplan on GMA 7
 Liberty on TV on GMA 7
 Sounds Family on GMA 7
 MVP: Monday Viva Presentations on GMA 7
 Starla at ang mga Jewel Riders on GMA 7
 The Rev. Ernest Angley Hour on GMA 7
 PSE Live: The Stock Market Today on SBN 21
 Law & Order on Citynet 27
 Blossom on Citynet 27
 Home Improvement on Citynet 27
 Nora Aunor Sunday Drama Special on ABC 5
 Better Home Ideas on ABC 5
 The Troika Tonite on ABC 5
 Jesus Miracle Crusade on PTV 4
 Ang Pangarap Kong Jackpot on PTV 4
 Constel on PTV 4
 Fiveman on IBC 13
 For God and Country on IBC 13
 Konsumer Korner on IBC 13
 Magandang Umaga Ba? on IBC 13
 TV Patrol Pagadian on ABS-CBN TV-9 Pagadian
 The Morning Show on ABS-CBN TV-4 Bacolod

Programs transferring networks

Finales
January 26: Okay Ka, Fairy Ko! on ABS-CBN 2
January 27:
 Eat Bulaga! on ABS-CBN 2
 Valiente on ABS-CBN 2
January 29: Sa Linggo nAPO Sila on ABS-CBN 2
June 9: TV Patrol 4 on ABS-CBN TV-4 Bacolod
June 30: SST: Salo-Salo Together on GMA 7
July 6: Ryan Ryan Musikahan on ABS-CBN 2
July 7:
IBC News 5:30 Report on IBC 13
IBC News 11 O'Clock Report on IBC 13
September 23: Movie Magazine on GMA 7
September 29:
Vilma on GMA 7
Hanggang Kailan, Anna Luna? (Ikalawang Aklat) on RPN 9
October 1:
Show & Tell on GMA 7
News on 4 on PTV 4
October 13: Haybol Rambol on GMA 7
October 21: Inside Showbiz on GMA 7

Unknown
 Mr. Cupido on ABS-CBN 2
 Eh Kasi Bata! on ABS-CBN 2
 Tatak Pilipino: Bagong Yugto on ABS-CBN 2
 Yan ang Bata on ABS-CBN 2
 Home Improvement on GMA 7
 R.S.V.P. on GMA 7
 Toynk (Hulog ng Langit) on GMA 7
 Profiles of Power on GMA 7
 Liberty Live with Joe Taruc on GMA 7
 Billy Bilyonaryo on GMA 7
 Modern Romance Sa Telebisyon on GMA 7
 Teen Talk on GMA 7
 Super Games on GMA 7
 Movie Patrol on GMA 7
 The Rev. Ernest Angley Hour on GMA 7
 Law & Order on GMA 7
 NBA Action on GMA 7
 NBA Inside Stuff on GMA 7
 Blossom on GMA 7
 Saturday Entertainment on GMA 7
 Idol si Pidol on ABC 5
 Mysteries 2000 on ABC 5
 Nap Knock on ABC 5
 Isang Tanong, Isang Sagot! on ABC 5
 Police Academy: The Series on ABC 5
 Windows with Johnny Revilla on PTV 4
 Ikaw ang Mahal Ko on PTV 4
 Smashing Action! on PTV 4
 Buddy En Sol on RPN 9
 Malayo Pa Ang Umaga on RPN 9
 Basta Barkada on RPN 9
 Movieparade on RPN 9
 It's A Date on RPN 9
 Pasikatan sa 9 on RPN 9
 Miranova on RPN 9
 Your Evening with Pilita on RPN 9
 For God and Country on IBC 13
 No Nonsense! on IBC 13
 Aiko Drama Special on IBC 13
 Maiba Naman with Didi Domingo on IBC 13
 All For Jesus Happenings on IBC 13

Channels

Launches
 August 27 - Citynet 27

Unknown
 DBS 11

Rebranded
 September 1 - Cartoon Network (Southeast Asia) → Cartoon Network (Philippines)

Births
January 5 - 
Joyce Ching, actress
Lexi Fernandez, actress and singer
February 20 - McCoy de Leon, actor, dancer and model
February 28 - Kim Domingo, actress, TV commercial and model
March 3 - Maine Mendoza, actress
March 19 - Julia Montes, actress
March 27 - Koreen Medina, actress and beauty queen
April 25 - Arra San Agustin, actress
April 26 - Daniel Padilla, actor and singer
May 3 – Shaira Diaz, actress
May 11 - Yassi Pressman, Hong Kong-Filipino actress and dancer
May 18 - Tricia Santos, actress and athlete
May 19 - Abel Estanislao, actor and model
May 21 - Diego Loyzaga, actor
May 23 - Eula Caballero, actress
June 1 - Mariz Rañeses, Broadcaster (former actress and TV host)
June 4:
 Jerome Ponce, actor
 Kiko Estrada, actor
June 15 – David Licauco, actor
June 20 – Katherine Loria, singer
July 18 - Phytos Ramirez, actor, TV commercial and model
July 29:
 Jin Macapagal, actor, model, and dancer
 Kiray Celis, actress
August 1 - Derrick Monasterio, actor, dancer and singer
August 7 – Tony Labrusca, actor
August 18 – Jon Lucas, actor
August 21 – Gil Cuerva, actor
August 23 - Eliza Pineda, actress
August 29 - Aria Clemente, actress and singer
August 30 – Addy Raj, actor, singer, and model
September 3 – AJ Raval, actress
September 6 - John Manalo, actor
September 15 - Rita Daniela, actress and singer
September 23 - Felix Abalayan, actor, dancer and model
September 24 – Gigi De Lana, singer
October 13 - Melchor Gallaza, actor, dancer and TV host
October 29 - Eumir Marcial, boxer
October 30 - Chanel Morales, actress
November 22 – Gab Lagman, actor and model
November 26 - Michael Pangilinan, singer
November 27 – Yohan Hwang, singer
December 7 - Kamille Filoteo, actress

Deaths
March 8 - Ike Lozada, 54, comedian, actor, and TV host (born August 13, 1940)
June 11 - Rodel Naval, 42, singer, songwriter and actor (born February 16, 1953)
September 5 - Andy Poe, 52, actor (born May 4, 1943)
December 16 - Bert Marcelo, 59, actor and comedian (born June 6, 1936)
December 18 - Panchito Alba, 70, actor and comedian (born February 25, 1925)

See also
1995 in television

 
Television in the Philippines by year
Philippine television-related lists